Julius Waweru Karangi (born 28 April 1951) is a retired military officer from Kenya who was Chief of the General Staff of the Kenya Defence Forces from 2011 until 2015.

Military career
Julius Karangi joined the Kenya Air Force in 1973. He trained as a cadet in the United Kingdom and was commissioned as an officer in 1974. He qualified as a flight navigator in October 1975 and was assigned to the Flying Wing of the Kenya Air Force.

 1995 – Commander of Moi Air Base
 1997 – Commander of the Kenya Air Force Logistics Command
 1998 – Chief of Procurement of the Kenya Defence Forces
 1999 – Head of training, doctrine and procurement at the office of the Assistant Chief of Defence Forces
 2000 – Commandant of the Defence Staff College  
 2003 – Commander of the Kenya Air Force 
 2005 – Vice Chief of Defence Forces
 2011 – Chief of the General Staff
 2015 – Retirement

Honours and awards
General Karangi received the Order of the Golden Heart of Kenya, the Order of the Burning Spear and the Legion of Merit.

References

|-

Living people
Kenyan military personnel
Air force generals
Foreign recipients of the Legion of Merit
Elders of the Order of the Golden Heart of Kenya
Chiefs of the Order of the Burning Spear
Flight navigators
1951 births